Spencer Oliver Fisher (February 3, 1843 – June 1, 1919), was a politician from the U.S. state of Michigan.

Fisher was born in Camden, Michigan, where he attended the public schools. He also attended Albion College and Hillsdale College. He engaged in lumbering and banking in West Bay City, where he was mayor, 1881-1884. He was a delegate to the Democratic National Convention of 1884

Fisher was elected as a Democrat from Michigan's 10th congressional district to the 49th and 50th Congresses, serving from March 4, 1885 to March 3, 1889. He was an unsuccessful candidate for reelection in 1888, being defeated by Frank W. Wheeler, and resumed his former business pursuits in Bay City.

Fisher was a candidate for Governor of Michigan in 1894, but was defeated by the Republican incumbent John Tyler Rich.  He died twenty-five years later at the age of seventy-six in Bay City and is interred there in Elm Lawn Cemetery.

References

Spencer O. Fisher at The Political Graveyard

1843 births
1919 deaths
Albion College alumni
Burials in Michigan
Democratic Party members of the United States House of Representatives from Michigan
Hillsdale College alumni
Mayors of places in Michigan
19th-century American politicians